Stara Lipa can refer to one of the following towns:

 Stara Lipa, Črnomelj, a village in the Municipality of Črnomelj, southeastern Slovenia
 Stara Lipa, Croatia